The list of ship commissionings in 1871 includes a chronological list of all ships commissioned in 1871.

References 

1871